The men's 4 × 100 metres relay event at the 2004 African Championships in Athletics was held in Brazzaville, Republic of the Congo on July 16.

Results

References
Results

2004 African Championships in Athletics
Relays at the African Championships in Athletics